Toussaint McCall (born 1934 in Monroe, Louisiana) is an American R&B singer and organist.

His one major success was with "Nothing Takes the Place of You", which reached #5 in the US R&B chart, issued on Ronn Records in 1967.  Although further singles and an album followed, he did not repeat its success.

He continued performing and recording for local record labels, and in 1988 made a cameo appearance in the John Waters film Hairspray, lip syncing to his hit song. The movie took place in 1962 Baltimore, but his hit was originally recorded and released in 1967, making his appearance in the movie somewhat anachronistic.

Charting singles
"I'll Do It for You" (1967) US #77, US R&B #26
"Nothing Takes the Place of You" (1967) US #52, US R&B #5

Cover versions
Asleep at the Wheel covered the song (as "Nothin' Takes the Place of You") in 1976. Their version reached #35 on the U.S. Country chart and #30 Canada Country during the spring of the year.

Shovels & Rope covered “Nothing Takes the Place of You” on their 2015 album Busted Jukebox, Vol. 1 alongside JD McPherson.

Prince Buster, the Jamaican artist, recorded a ska version of “Nothing Takes the Place of You”

References

1934 births
Living people
American soul musicians
American male organists
Musicians from Monroe, Louisiana
Singers from Louisiana
20th-century organists
20th-century African-American male singers